Ali Cobby Eckermann (born 1963) is an Australian poet of Aboriginal Australian ancestry. She is a Yankunytjatjara / Kokatha woman born on Kaurna land in South Australia.

Eckermann has written poetry collections, verse novels and a memoir, and has been shortlisted for or won several literary awards. In 2017, she won the international Windham-Campbell Literature Prize for Poetry. She has travelled extensively, performing her poetry.

Early life
Ali Cobby Eckermann was born Penelope Rae Cobby at the Kate Cocks Memorial Babies’ Home in Adelaide, traditional home of the Kaurna people, in 1963. She was adopted as a baby by a Lutheran couple, Clarrie and Frieda Eckermann. She grew up on a farm, and did her schooling at Brinkworth Area School and Clare High School, in mid-north South Australia.

Eckermann, her mother and her grandmother were all stolen, tricked or adopted away from their birth families, becoming part of the Stolen Generations.

She grew up in a loving supportive home, but she was assaulted sexually by a family friend when she seven years old, and experienced ongoing abuse and racism while growing up. At 17 she left home with a man with whom she lived for two years, but whom she left due to his violence. She returned home, only to discover she was pregnant, and gave birth when she was 19. Her son was adopted out.

After turning 18, Eckermann began searching for her birth mother, Audrey, but didn't find her until she was 34, after information had been released with the Bringing Them Home report in 1997. Four years later, she found her son Jonnie.

Most of her early adult life was spent in the Northern Territory, on Arrernte country, Jawoyn country and Larrakia country. She worked in various places, including a remote arts centre outside Alice Springs.

She says "I learnt to live in two different ways over my life. I learnt a good example of hard work and kindness from growing up with my mum and dad in my adopted family. And I’m extremely grateful that my traditional family welcomed me back with such love and honesty. I got a second chance to live in an honest world".

Writing career
Eckermann's literary career was established in 2009 after she submitted her first collection of poetry to a manuscript competition run by Australian Poetry. It was published under the title, Little Bit Long Time, first in pamphlet form by the Australian Poetry Centre and then in book form, both in 2009. Its subject matter is the problematic history of Indigenous Australians since colonial times, which means that she explores both her own life and experience, as an indigenous woman, as well as looking at the historical perspective. She returns to this subject matter repeatedly in her work.

Since then, she has published three more poetry collections, two verse novels and a memoir.

Her third book, and second verse novel, Ruby Moonlight, was awarded both Book of the Year and the Kenneth Slessor Prize for Poetry in the 2013 New South Wales Premier's Literary Awards.

Eckermann founded Australia's first Aboriginal Writers Retreat in Koolunga, in a 130-year-old general store which she restored.

In 2014, she participated in the International Writing Program's Fall Residency at the University of Iowa in Iowa City, United States.

Verse novels
Eckermann has written two verse novels, His Father's Eyes and Ruby Moonlight.

Ruby Moonlight is set in remote South Australia in the 1880s. It explores, writes Sarah Holland-Batt, "broader ideas about colonialism’s hierarchies and power structures, and its lingering historical impact on the first peoples of this country, on language, and on the very landscape itself. One of the most remarkable things about Ruby Moonlight is the subtlety with which its political implications are handled: Eckermann invites (rather than dictates) political readings of what is, at heart, a simple and highly engaging narrative."

Other activities
, Eckermann is on the board of the First Nations Australia Writers Network (FNAWN).

Awards and nominations
 2013 New South Wales Premier's Literary Awards, winner of Book of the Year and Kenneth Slessor Prize for Poetry for Ruby Moonlight
 2013 Tangkanungku Pintyanthi Fellowship for Too Afraid to Cry
 2014 Adelaide Festival Awards for Literature John Bray Poetry Award, shortlisted for Ruby Moonlight
 2015 New South Wales Premier's Literary Awards, shortlisted for Indigenous Writers' Prize for Inside My Mother
 2016 Victorian Premier's Literary Award for Indigenous Writing, shortlisted for Inside My Mother
 2017 Windham-Campbell Literature Prizes for Poetry
 2018 Australia Council for the Arts Literature Fellowship

Bibliography

  (poetry collection)
  (poetry collection)
  (verse novel)
  (poetry collection)
  (memoir)
  (poetry collection)

References 

1963 births
Living people
Australian women poets
Indigenous Australian writers
Writers from South Australia
21st-century Australian novelists
21st-century Australian women writers
21st-century Australian poets